WCNO (89.9 FM) is a radio station broadcasting a Christian format combining teaching and other forms of spoken word with what's often called "inspirational" Christian music, a lighter and more traditional variety. Licensed to Palm City, Florida, United States, the station serves the West Palm Beach area and north to Vero Beach.  The station is owned by National Christian Network, Inc.

References

External links

CNO